Nicolas-Toussaint Lemoyne des Essarts or Desessarts, (1 November 1744 – Coutances, 5 October 1810 aged 65) was a French bibliographer.

Publications 
First a lawyer then a bookseller, he was the author or editor of voluminous compilations of which the best known are:
 Causes célèbres, 1773–1789, 196 volumes in-12 ;
 Dictionnaire universel de police contenant l’origine et les progrès de cette partie importante de l’administration civile en France..., Paris : chez Moutard, 1786–1790, 8 vol. in-4°, LXVII-5116 p. (articles ‘abandon’ à ‘police’)
 Bibliothèque de l'homme de goût, 1798, 3 volumes in-8 (rewritten in 1808, with Antoine Alexandre Barbier) ;
 Les Siècles littéraires de la France, ou Nouveau dictionnaire, historique, critique, et bibliographique, de tous les écrivains français, morts et vivans, jusqu'à la fin du XVIIIe, 1800–1803, 7 volumes in-8.
 Nouveau dictionnaire bibliographique portatif, ou Essai de bibliographie universelle ; contenant l'indication des meilleurs ouvrages qui ont paru dans tous les genres, tant en France que chez les nations étrangères, anciennes et modernes; précédé d'une nouvelle édition des Conseils pour former une bibliothèque peu nombreuse, mais choisie, Paris : chez l'auteur, 1799
 Précis historique de la vie, des crimes et du supplice de Robespierre et de ses principaux complices (Paris, chez Des Essarts, An V (1797), 3 tomes où Robespierre y est décrit comme «le plus hypocrite, le plus lâche, le plus féroce des monstres à figure humaine», le «plus exécrable des tyrans qui ait paru sur la scène du monde pour le malheur de l'humanité» (Tome I)

Sources

External links 
 Des Essarts on data.bnf.fr

French bibliographers
1744 births
1810 deaths